Facundo Agustín Cáseres (born 28 May 2001) is an Argentine professional footballer who plays as a midfielder for NK Istra 1961, on loan from Vélez Sarsfield.

Career
Born in Arteaga, Cáseres joined the academy of Vélez Sarsfield in 2014. He was promoted into their senior set-up in early 2019, though wouldn't make an appearance on a competitive first-team teamsheet until October 2020. He was an unused substitute for a Copa Sudamericana draw with Peñarol on 28 October, which preceded his senior bow arriving on 31 October in a 1–1 draw at home to Huracán in the Copa de la Liga Profesional; he started and remained for sixty-four minutes, before being substituted for Lucas Janson.

In August 2021, Cáseres was introduced as a new player of the Croatian club NK Istra 1961, on a one-year loan from Vélez Sarsfield.  On 26 July 2022, Veléz confirmed that the loan spell had been extended with one year further.

Career statistics
.

Notes

References

External links

2001 births
Living people
People from Caseros Department
Argentine footballers
Argentine expatriate footballers
Association football midfielders
Sportspeople from Santa Fe Province
Club Atlético Vélez Sarsfield footballers
NK Istra 1961 players
Argentine Primera División players
Croatian Football League players
Expatriate footballers in Croatia
Argentine expatriate sportspeople in Croatia